St. Peter Catholic School may refer to;
 St. Peter Catholic High School, Ottawa, Canada 
 St Peter Catholic School, Guelph, Ontario, Canada

See also
 St. Peter's RC School (disambiguation)
 St Peter's School (disambiguation)